The Calling is an album by the Aquarium Rescue Unit. The band's second record following the departure of former frontman Bruce Hampton, it was recorded in 2000 at Exocet Studio in Atlanta, Georgia, and was released in 2003 by Inio Music. The album features guitarist Jimmy Herring, keyboardist and flutist Kofi Burbridge, bassist Oteil Burbridge, vocalist Paul Henson, and drummer Sean O'Rourke, plus a number of guest musicians.

Reception
Producer and journalist George Graham wrote: "On The Calling the band continues to shows its Southern rock roots throughout... With the re-emergence of The A-R-U we have the return of an outstanding group who last appeared before there was much of a contemporary jam band scene. Their musicianship is beyond reproach and the jazz-fusion influence gives this CD added artistic heft."

In a review for The Aspen Times, Stewart Oksenhorn stated: "It's hard to evaluate The Calling without comparing it to the albums with the original lineup. Yes, the instrumentation is fabulous complex and hard-hitting. But Henson, a good singer, doesn't have the vocal character of Hampton... The Calling is good, but that original mojo is missing. Calling the Colonel!"

Jesse Jarnow of Jambands.com called the album "a pale, pale shadow of what the band once represented," and commented: "Instead of reveling in it, the music now only borders on the abstract, instead favoring an adult contemporary liteness that is so far in that I'm almost willing to accept it as a big joke... What's missing, conceptually, is the band's triumphant sense of playfulness." However, he acknowledged that "it's always a joy to hear Jimmy Herring and Oteil Burbridge play music together."

A reviewer for ProGGnosis described the album as "a funky, soulful, r&b centered mix, with some slants towards fusion and jam rock," and remarked: "for those that enjoy a sincere, downhome, Southern r&b feel, with vocal oriented songs, paired with members that just happens to have the credentials to be a hot fusion band, a band that rears that venom from time to time, this is a great cd!"

Track listing

 "Hurt No More" (Oteil Burbridge / Paul Henson) – 3:43
 "The Calling" (Paul Henson / Jimmy Herring) – 5:30
 "Nice" (Kofi Burbridge / Paul Henson) – 7:02
 "Through the Fire" (Kofi Burbridge / Paul Henson) – 5:47
 "No Egos" (Oteil Burbridge / Col. Bruce Hampton) – 6:02
 "Precious Child" (Oteil Burbridge / Paul Henson) – 5:44	
 "King in the Making" (Paul Henson / Jimmy Herring) – 3:50
 "Ride" (Kofi Burbridge) – 6:36
 "Page in Time" (Oteil Burbridge / Paul Henson) – 3:49
 "How Ya Livin" (Paul Henson / Jimmy Herring) – 5:34
 "Reflections" (Oteil Burbridge / Paul Henson) – 3:28
 "Usaidtheredbefish" (Kofi Burbridge / Oteil Burbridge / Paul Henson / Jimmy Herring) – 5:01

Personnel 
 Jimmy Herring – guitar
 Kofi Burbridge – keyboards, flute, vocals
 Oteil Burbridge – bass, vocals
 Paul Henson – vocals
 Sean O'Rourke – drums, vocals

Additional musicians 
 Derek Trucks – slide guitar (track 10)
 Count Mbutu – congas
 Brian Lopes – saxophone
 Sam Skelton – saxophone
 Eric Alexander – trombone
 Myrna Clayton – vocals
 Andrea Hopkins – vocals

References

2003 albums
Aquarium Rescue Unit albums